Clubul Sportiv Municipal Sighetu Marmației, commonly known as CSM Sighetu Marmației, or simply as Sighetu Marmației (is a Romanian football club based in Sighetu Marmației, Maramureș County, currently playing in the Liga III.

History
The club was founded in 1996 to continue the football tradition in Sighetu Marmației after the dissolution of CIL Sighetu Marmației, a team which played for many years in Liga II.

On 13 May 2016 CSM Sighetu Marmației withdrew from Liga III and was dissolved.

In the summer of 2019, after 3 years of inactivity, the football section of the sports club was refounded.

On 28 April 2021, CSM Sighetu Marmației, led by Romulus Buia, won the 2020–21 Liga IV Maramureș mini-tournament, organised by AJF (County Football Association) Maramureș, beating Lăpușul Târgu Lăpuș in the final with 3–0, qualifying to the Liga IV promotion play-off.

Honours
Liga IV – Maramureș County
Winners (7): 2000–01, 2004–05, 2006–07, 2010–11, 2013–14, 2020–21, 2021–22

Players

First-team squad

Out on loan

Club officials

Board of directors

Current technical staff

League history

References

External links
 Marmația Sighet fixtures and results

Football clubs in Maramureș County
Association football clubs established in 1996
Liga III clubs
Liga IV clubs
1996 establishments in Romania